Doris Taufateau (born 29 July 1987) is a female rugby union player for  and Auckland. She was a member of the 2010 Women's Rugby World Cup winning squad.

Taufateau completed a bachelor's degree in Physical Education in 2013. She currently teaches at the high school she attended as a student, Tamaki College.

References

External links
Black Ferns Profile

1987 births
Living people
New Zealand women's international rugby union players
New Zealand female rugby union players
Rugby union players from Auckland